Alan Louis Breeze (9 October 1909 – 15 January 1980) was an English singer of the British dance band era and regular entertainer on the post-war BBC radio programme the Billy Cotton Band Show.

He was born in West Ham, London, to Louis Breeze, a concert and oratorio singer and a member of the D'Oyly Carte Opera Company, and his wife Isobel, who taught with the old London County Council.

At the beginning of his career, Breeze sang in working men's clubs, restaurants and even theatre queues. He produced some 78 recordings, for example from his later repertoire: "I've Got a Lovely Bunch of Coconuts". He produced recordings at film studios for actors who could not sing. He met the band leader Billy Cotton, who was to change his career forever.

Breeze started with Billy Cotton in 1932, without a contract, and stayed for 36 years. He became one of the most popular UK vocalists, on radio, television and in theatres around the United Kingdom. His recordings are still occasionally heard on the radio.

Alan Breeze died 15 January 1980 in Norwich aged 70.

External links
 
 Official Alan Breeze website
 Billy Cotton Band Show website

References

1909 births
1980 deaths
English male singers
Billy Cotton Band Show
20th-century English singers
20th-century British male singers